Philip Azango Elayo (born 21 May 1997) is a Nigerian professional footballer who plays as a winger for AS Trenčín. He signed contract for Spartak Trnava for 2023 season.

References

External links
 AS Trenčín official club profile 
 
 Futbalnet Profile 

1997 births
Living people
Nigerian footballers
Nigerian expatriate footballers
Association football wingers
Nasrawa United players
Plateau United F.C. players
AS Trenčín players

Slovak Super Liga players
K.A.A. Gent players
Belgian Pro League players
Expatriate footballers in Slovakia
Expatriate footballers in Belgium
Nigerian expatriate sportspeople in Belgium
Nigerian expatriate sportspeople in Slovakia